Dylewska Góra is a hill located in northeastern Poland, south of the town of Ostróda, in the Warmian-Masurian Voivodeship. With elevation of 312 metres above sea level, it is one of the highest points of northern and central Poland. Dylewska Góra is a morainic hill, with its eastern and northern slopes covered by beech forest. On top there is a TV tower, as well as a 37-metre-high observation tower, which provides views of area up to 50 kilometres away.

See also 
 Geography of Poland

Landforms of Warmian-Masurian Voivodeship
Mountains of Poland